The 2014 elections for the Pennsylvania State Senate were held on November 4, 2014, with all even-numbered districts being contested. Primary elections were held on May 20, 2014. The term of office for those elected in 2014 began when the Senate convened in January 2015. Pennsylvania State Senators are elected to four-year terms, with 25 of the 50 seats contested every two years.

Republicans have controlled the chamber since the 1994 election (20 years) but Democrats competed to retake the majority. A net Democratic gain of two seats, combined with a win for their ticket of Tom Wolf and Michael J. Stack III in the 2014 gubernatorial election would have seen Stack become Lieutenant Governor of Pennsylvania and thus cast the tie-breaking vote to give Democrats the majority. Democrats hoped the unpopularity of Governor Tom Corbett would help in their efforts. Instead, the Republicans gained three seats from the Democrats to expand their majority.

Democratic Senator LeAnna Washington of the 4th District was the only incumbent to be defeated in the primary elections. She lost to attorney Art Haywood, shortly after she was charged with diversion of services and conflict of interest for illegally using her legislative staff for campaign purposes. She received 13,708 votes (33.82%) to Haywood's 16,113 (39.75%). Brian Gralnick, the director of the Center for Social Responsibility at the Jewish Federation of Greater Philadelphia, took 10,711 votes (26.43%).

Results overview

Polling
District 10

District 40

Special election
A special election was held on March 18, 2014, to fill the vacancy created by the resignation of Mike Waugh in January 2014.

General election

Source: Pennsylvania Department of State

References

2014 Pennsylvania elections
Pennsylvania State Senate elections
Pennsylvania Senate